"Roll It Gal" (otherwise known as "Roll It") is a song written by Shontelle Layne and Sheldon Benjamin, containing a sample of Benjamin's "Big Love". The song was originally recorded by soca singer Alison Hinds and was taken from her debut album Soca Queen. The single was released by Hinds in 2005 in Barbados and in the United Kingdom in 2007. A music video was produced for Hinds' version of the song in 2005. The Hinds version of "Roll It Gal" shot to the top of the charts in Barbados, Trinidad and throughout the Caribbean.

In 2007, a re-worked cover of the song entitled "Roll It" was released in several European countries. This version was performed by J-Status and featured Shontelle, who assisted in writing both versions of the song, and Rihanna.

Original version

Track listings

UK CD single

 "Roll It Gal" (original/main mix – radio edit) – 3:35
 "Roll It Gal" (Rishi Rich mix) – 3:29
 "Roll It Gal" (Machel Montano mix)
 "Roll It Gal" (Sunland mix)
 "Roll It Gal" (video)

UK 7" vinyl
 "Roll It Gal" (original/main mix – radio edit)
 "Roll It Gal" (Rishi Rich mix)
 "Roll It Gal" (Sunland mix)

Download remix EP

 "Roll It Gal" (album version) – 3:58
 "Roll It Gal" (featuring Machel Montano) – 5:08
 "Roll It Gal" (featuring Doug E Fresh) – 4:50
 "Roll It Gal" (Disco Ball remix) – 5:10
 "Roll It Gal" (Reggaeton remix) – 3:50
 "Roll It Gal" (Rishi Rich mix)

Charts

J-Status version

Shontelle and Sheldon Benjamin, the composers of "Roll It Gal" re-wrote and re-produced the song for the band J-Status, changing the lyrics from being about female empowerment to more sexual lyrics, re-titling the song to "Roll It". The J-Status version is taken from their debut album The Beginning, released in several European countries only. The J-Status version is performed with Rihanna and Shontelle herself.

Track listing
CD
 "Roll It" (featuring Rihanna and Shontelle) (radio version) – 3:32
 "Roll It" (featuring Rihanna and Shontelle) (main version) – 3:58
 "Roll It" (instrumental) – 3:23
 "Roll It" (featuring Rihanna and Shontelle) (Reggaeton Gemstar version) – 4:10
 "Roll It" (featuring Rihanna and Shontelle) (Sunset Strippers remix) – 7:42
 "Roll It" (featuring Rihanna and Shontelle) (video)

Charts

Other versions
In 2007, Shontelle finally recorded her own version of "Roll It" and it later appeared on her debut studio album Shontelligence (2008).

Track listing
Digital download
 "Roll" – 3:30

References

2005 debut singles
2005 songs
2007 singles
Soca songs
Rihanna songs
Shontelle songs
Music videos directed by Vashtie Kola
Songs written by Shontelle